William Kean Seymour (1887–1975) was a British writer, by profession a bank manager.   He was a poet and critic, novelist, journalist and literary editor.

His first wife was the novelist and short story writer Beatrice Kean Seymour, who died in 1955. His second wife was the novelist and short story writer Rosalind Wade, with whom he had two sons, one of whom is the writer Gerald Seymour.

Works

The Street of Dreams (1914) poems
To Verhaeren (1917) poems
Twenty-Four Poems (1918) poems
Swords and Flutes (1919) poems
Miscellany Of Poetry (1910) editor
A Jackdaw in Georgia (1925) parodies
Parrot Pie (1927) parodies
Caesar Remembers (1929) poems
Time Stands (1935) poems
The Little Cages (1944) first novel
Collected  Poems (1946) poems
So Sceptical My Heart (1951)
Store of Trees (1951)
Friends of the Swallow (1953)
The Secret Kingdom (1954)
Names & Faces (1956)
The First Childermas (1959) play
Pattern of Poetry (1963) with John Smith
Jonathan Swift: Enigma of a Genius (1967) biography
Silver Jubilee (1969)
The Cats of Rome (1970)

Poets in Miscellany of Poetry (1919)

Laurence Binyon - F. V. Branford - G. K. Chesterton - Richard Church - William H. Davies - Geoffrey Dearmer - John Drinkwater - Wilfrid Wilson Gibson - Louis Golding - Gerald Gould - Laurence Housman - Richard Le Gallienne - Eugene Mason - T. Sturge Moore - Theodore Maynard - Rose Macaulay - Thomas Moult - Robert Nichols - Eden Phillpotts - Arthur K. Sabin - Margaret Sackville - William Kean Seymour - Horace Shipp - Edith Sitwell - Muriel Stuart - W. R. Titterton - E. H. Visiak - Alec Waugh - Charles Williams

Notes

External links 
 
 

1887 births
1975 deaths
British male poets
20th-century British poets
20th-century British male writers